Per Dammen (born 11 June 1946) is a Norwegian curler.

He competed for Norway on four World championships.

Teams

References

External links
 

Living people
1946 births
Norwegian male curlers
Sportspeople from Bærum
Place of birth missing (living people)
20th-century Norwegian people